Jennifer Hudak (born September 7, 1986) is an American freestyle skier, specializing in the halfpipe event. Her professional skiing career began in 2004, when she won the US Free Skiing Open. In 2005 and 2006, Hudak won the Junior National and U.S. National Halfpipe Championship, respectively. She tore her ACL in 2012. She graduated in 2017 from the University of Utah with her bachelor's degree in psychology.

Television 
Hudak appeared on the 30th season of The Amazing Race with teammate Kristi Leskinen where they finished in 3rd place.

References

External links
 Official Website

1986 births
Living people
American female freestyle skiers
X Games athletes
People from Hamden, Connecticut
Sportspeople from Connecticut
Sportspeople from Utah
University of Utah alumni
The Amazing Race (American TV series) contestants